We Arm The World is a 1985 album by the Capitol Steps.

Track listing
Getting To The Dirge
Gorby Gorbachev
You Write Up My Wife
Home, Sweet Home / Hello, Vitaly
When I'm 62 / Keep a COLA
Deficit Discounters
Dutch The Magic Reagan
Perfect Present Residents / Ronald "R" Superstar
Meet the Press
Tax Lite
Stock Man
Nice Work
Mamas, Don't Let Your Babies Grow Up To Be Yuppies
Saab Story
'Crats
We Arm the World

References

Capitol Steps albums
1985 live albums
Self-released albums
1980s comedy albums